This article lists the official squads for the 2006 Women's Rugby World Cup.

Pool A

Coach: Jed Rowlands
Assistant coach: Dale Atkins





Pool B



Coach: Steve Hamson



Pool C



Head coach: Kathy Flores
Assistant coach: Candi Orsini
Assistant Backs Coach: Krista McFarren



Pool D

Coach: Neil Langevin
Assistant coach: Matthew Stephens





Notes and references

Squads
2006